Michael James Dargan (born 9 October 1928 in Dublin) is a former Irish cricketer. A right-handed batsman, he played once for the Ireland cricket team, a first-class match against the MCC In September 1954. He is married to Freda Dargan. He also played two rugby union Test matches for Ireland In the 1952 Five Nations Championship.

References 

1928 births
Living people
Irish cricketers
Ireland international rugby union players
People educated at Rockwell College
Irish rugby union players
Old Belvedere R.F.C. players
Rugby union players from Dublin (city)
Cricketers from Dublin (city)